Walter Osvaldo Perazzo Otero (born August 2, 1962) is a Colombian born Argentine football manager, currently in charge of Güemes, and former centre forward.

Biography 
Perazzo was born in Bogotá, Colombia while his father Alberto was playing football with Colombian club Independiente Santa Fe. Both his parents are Argentine.

He started his career in 1979 in San Lorenzo, where he debuted in Primera División on November 18, with only 17 years old, after replacing Miguel Gette. San Lorenzo beat Club Cipolletti 4–0 at Estadio Gasómetro. His first goal in Primera was scored v Ferro Carril Oeste on February 24, 1980. He played in San Lorenzo until 1982 when he was traded on loan to Estudiantes de La Plata due to then coach Juan Carlos Lorenzo did not have him into account. Perazzo was part of the team that won the 1982 Metropolitano coached by Carlos Bilardo. One year later, he emigrated to Colombia to play for Independiente Santa Fe

At the end of 1983, Perazzo returned to San Lorenzo where he reached its peak, scoring 77 goals in 240 matches that helped him become an idol for its supporters. He stayed in Boedo until 1988, when he was transferred to Boca Juniors for US$200,000. Perazzo played two seasons (1988–90) for Boca Juniors but the great expectations were not fulfilled, scoring 12 goals in 56 matches.

In 1991, he moved to Argentinos Juniors where he only scored one goal in 8 matches. That same year Perazzo returned to Colombia to play in Deportivo Cali (1991), then moving to Club Bolívar (1992–93). In 1994, Perazzo debuted in South Korean K League playing for Daewoo Royals. He then played for Canadian team Montreal Supra before retiring from football.

After retiring, Perazzo became manager, coaching the Argentina U20 in 2010–11.

Titles 
Estudiantes LP
 Argentine Primera División (1): 1982 Metropolitano
Boca Juniors
 Supercopa Libertadores (1): 1989
Bolívar
 Liga Profesional (1): 1992

References

External links

 
 
 Walter Perazzo at Footballdatabase

Living people
1962 births
Footballers from Bogotá
Association football forwards
Colombian footballers
Citizens of Argentina through descent
Argentine footballers
Colombian expatriate footballers
Argentine expatriate footballers
Argentine Primera División players
San Lorenzo de Almagro footballers
Estudiantes de La Plata footballers
Boca Juniors footballers
Argentinos Juniors footballers
Independiente Santa Fe footballers
Deportivo Cali footballers
Club Bolívar players
Busan IPark players
K League 1 players
Expatriate footballers in Bolivia
Expatriate footballers in South Korea
Argentine football managers
Argentina national under-20 football team managers
Olimpo managers
Ferro Carril Oeste managers
Aldosivi managers
Nueva Chicago managers